West Ham United Football Club is an English professional football club that plays its home matches in Stratford, East London. The club competes in the Premier League, the top tier of English football. The club plays at the London Stadium, having moved from their former home, the Boleyn Ground, in 2016.

The club was founded in 1895 as Thames Ironworks and reformed in 1900 as West Ham United. They moved to the Boleyn Ground in 1904, which remained their home ground for more than a century. The team initially competed in the Southern League and Western League before joining the Football League in 1919. They were promoted to the top flight in 1923, when they were also losing finalists in the first FA Cup Final held at Wembley. In 1940, the club won the inaugural Football League War Cup.

West Ham have been winners of the FA Cup three times (1964, 1975 and 1980) and runners-up twice (1923 and 2006). The club have reached two major European finals, winning the European Cup Winners' Cup in 1965 and finishing runners-up in the same competition in 1976. West Ham also won the Intertoto Cup in 1999. They are one of eight clubs never to have fallen below the second tier of English football, spending 63 of 95 league seasons in the top flight, up to and including the 2020–21 season. The club's highest league position to date came in 1985–86, when they achieved third place in the then First Division.

Three West Ham players were members of the 1966 World Cup final-winning England team: captain Bobby Moore and goalscorers Geoff Hurst and Martin Peters. The club has a long-standing rivalry with Millwall, and the fixture has gained notoriety for frequent incidents of football hooliganism. West Ham adopted their claret and sky blue colour scheme in the early 1900s, with the most common iteration of a claret shirt and sky blue sleeves first emerging in 1904.

History

Origins

The earliest generally accepted incarnation of West Ham United was founded in 1895 as Thames Ironworks F.C., the works team of the largest and last surviving shipbuilder on the Thames, Thames Ironworks and Shipbuilding Company, by foreman and local league referee Dave Taylor and owner Arnold Hills and was announced in the Thames Ironworks Gazette of June 1895. Thames Ironworks was based in Leamouth Wharf in Blackwall and Canning Town on both banks of the River Lea, where the Lea meets the Thames. Thames Ironworks built many ships and other structures, the most famous being . The last ship built there was the dreadnought  in 1912 and the yard shut soon after.

The repair yard of the Castle Shipping Line was a very near neighbour and their work team, initially known as the Castle Swifts, would informally merge with the Thames Ironworks own team.

The team played on a strictly amateur basis for 1895 at least, with a team featuring a number of works employees. Thomas Freeman was a ships fireman and Walter Parks, a clerk. Johnny Stewart, Walter Tranter and James Lindsay were all boilermakers. Other employees included William Chapman, George Sage and Fred Chamberlain, as well as apprentice riveter Charlie Dove, who was to have a great influence on the club's future at a later date.

Thames Ironworks won the West Ham Charity Cup, contested by clubs in the West Ham locality, in 1895, then won the London League in 1897. They turned professional in 1898 upon entering the Southern League Second Division, and were promoted to the First Division at the first attempt. The following year they came second from bottom, but had established themselves as a fully fledged competitive team. They comfortably fended off the challenge of local rivals Fulham in a relegation play-off, 5–1 in late April 1900 and retained their First Division status.

The team initially played in full dark blue kits, as inspired by Mr. Hills, who had been an Oxford University "Blue," but changed the following season by adopting the sky blue shirts and white shorts combination worn from 1897 to 1899.

Following growing disputes over the running and financing of the club, in June 1900 Thames Ironworks F.C. was disbanded, then almost immediately relaunched as West Ham United F.C. — reflecting the West Ham, London district where they played — on 5 July 1900 with Syd King as their manager and future manager Charlie Paynter as his assistant. Because of the original "works team" roots and links (still represented upon the club badge), they are still known as "the Irons" or "the Hammers" amongst fans and the media.

Birth of West Ham United (1901–1961)
West Ham United joined the Western League for the 1901 season while also continuing to play in the Southern Division 1. In 1907, West Ham were crowned the Western League Division 1B Champions, and then defeated 1A champions Fulham 1–0 to become the Western League Overall Champions. The reborn club continued to play their games at the Memorial Grounds in Plaistow (funded by Arnold Hills) but moved to a pitch in the Upton Park area in the guise of the Boleyn Ground stadium in 1904. West Ham's first game in their new home was against fierce rivals Millwall (themselves an Ironworks team, albeit for a rival company) drawing a crowd of 10,000 and with West Ham running out 3–0 winners, and as the Daily Mirror wrote on 2 September 1904, "Favoured by the weather turning fine after heavy rains of the morning, West Ham United began their season most auspiciously yesterday evening; when they beat Millwall by 3 goals to 0 on their new enclosure at Upton Park."

In 1919, still under King's leadership, West Ham gained entrance to the Football League Second Division, their first game being a 1–1 draw with Lincoln City, and were promoted to Division One in 1923, also making it to the first ever FA Cup Final to be held at the old Wembley stadium. Their opponents were Bolton Wanderers. This was also known as the White Horse Final, so named because an estimated 200,000 people came to see the match; spilling out on to the pitch, which had to be cleared prior to kick-off, by "Billie," a giant white horse (actually grey) being ridden by PC George Scorey. The Cup Final match itself ended 2–0 to Bolton. The team enjoyed mixed success in Division 1 but retained their status for ten years and reached the FA Cup semi-final in 1933.

In 1932, the club was relegated to Division Two and long term custodian Syd King was sacked after serving the club in the role of manager for 32 years, and as a player from 1899 to 1903. Following relegation, King had mental health problems. He appeared drunk at a board meeting and soon after committed suicide. He was replaced with his assistant manager Charlie Paynter, who himself had been with West Ham in a number of roles since 1897 and who went on to serve the team in this role until 1950 for a total of 480 games. The club spent most of the next 30 years in this division, first under Paynter and then later under the leadership of former player Ted Fenton.

Fenton succeeded in getting the club once again promoted to the top level of English football in 1958. With the considerable input of player Malcolm Allison, Fenton helped develop both the initial batch of future West Ham stars and West Ham's approach to the game.

Glory years (1961–1978)
Ron Greenwood was appointed as Fenton's successor in 1961 and soon led the club to two major trophies, winning the 1964 FA Cup Final. The team was led by the young Bobby Moore. West Ham also won the European Cup Winners' Cup. During the 1966 FIFA World Cup, key members of the tournament winners England were West Ham players, including the captain, Bobby Moore; Martin Peters (who scored in the final); and Geoff Hurst, who scored the first, and only, hat-trick in a men's World Cup final. All three players had come through the youth team at West Ham. 
There is a "Champions" statue in Barking Road, opposite The Boleyn Tavern, commemorating West Ham's "three sons" who helped win the 1966 World Cup: Bobby Moore, Geoff Hurst and Martin Peters. Also included on the statue is Everton's Ray Wilson.
They also won the FA Cup in 1975 by defeating Fulham 2–0. The Fulham team had former England captains Alan Mullery and West Ham legend Bobby Moore.

After a difficult start to the 1974–75 season, Greenwood moved himself "upstairs" to become general manager and, without informing the board, appointed his assistant John Lyall as team manager. The result was instant success – the team scored 20 goals in their first four games combined and won the FA Cup, becoming the last team to win the FA Cup with an all-English side when they beat Fulham 2–0 in the 1975 final. Lyall then guided West Ham to another European Cup Winners' Cup final in 1976, though the team lost the match 4–2 to Belgian side Anderlecht. Greenwood's tenure as general manager lasted less than three years, as he was appointed to manage England in the wake of Don Revie's resignation in 1977.

Ups and downs (1978–2005)
In 1978, West Ham were again relegated to Division Two, but Lyall was retained as manager and led the team to an FA Cup Final win against Arsenal in 1980, their last major honour.  They reached the final by defeating Everton in the semi-final. The Hammers won 1–0, with a goal scored from a header by Trevor Brooking in the 13th minute. This is notable as no team outside the top division has won the trophy since. West Ham were promoted to Division One in 1981, and finished in the top ten of the first division for the next three seasons before achieving their highest-ever league finish of third in 1985–86; a group of players which came to be known as The Boys of 86. However, they suffered relegation again in 1989, which resulted in Lyall's sacking. He was awarded an ex gratia payment of £100,000 but left the club in what Lyall described as "upsetting" circumstances, meriting only 73 words in a terse acknowledgement of his service in the club programme. Lyall left West Ham after 34 years service.

After Lyall, Lou Macari briefly led the team, though he resigned after less than a single season in order to clear his name of allegations of illegal betting while manager of Swindon Town.
He was replaced by former player Billy Bonds. In Bonds' first full season, 1990–91, West Ham again secured promotion to Division One. Now back in the top flight, Bonds saw West Ham through one of their most controversial seasons. With the club planning to introduce a bond scheme, there was crowd unrest. West Ham finished last and were relegated back to Division Two after only one season. However, they rebounded strongly in 1992–93. With Trevor Morley and Clive Allen scoring 40 goals, they guaranteed themselves second place on the last day of the season with a 2–0 home win against Cambridge United, and with it promotion to the Premier League.

With the team in the Premier League, there was a need to rebuild the team. Oxford United player Joey Beauchamp was recruited for a fee of £1.2 million. Shortly after arriving at the club, however, he became unhappy, citing homesickness from his native Oxford as the reason. Bonds in particular found this attitude hard to understand compared to his own committed, never-say-die approach; providing for Bonds' further evidence of the decay in the modern game and modern player. Fifty-eight days later, Beauchamp was signed by Swindon Town for a club-record combined fee of £800,000 which included defender Adrian Whitbread going in the opposite direction. Whitbread was valued at £750,000 in the deal.

Assistant manager Harry Redknapp was also now taking a bigger role in the transfer of players, with the club's approval. With rumours of his old club AFC Bournemouth being prepared to offer him a position, the West Ham board and their managing director, Peter Storrie, made a controversial move. The board were anxious not to lose Redknapp's services and offered Bonds a place away from the day-to-day affairs of the club—on the West Ham board. This would have allowed them to appoint Redknapp as manager. Bonds refused the post offered and walked away from the club. His accusations of deceit and manipulation by the board and by Redknapp have continued to cause ill-feeling. Peter Storrie claimed that they had handled the situation correctly, saying, "If Harry had gone to Bournemouth, there was a good chance Bill would have resigned anyway, so we were in a no-win situation. We're sad that Bill is going, and it's a big blow but it's time to move on and we have appointed a great manager."
Redknapp became manager on 10 August 1994.

Redknapp's time at West Ham was notable for the turnover of players during his tenure and for the level of attractive football and success which had not been seen since the managership of John Lyall. Over 134 players passed through the club while he was manager, producing a net transfer fee deficit of £16 million, despite the £18 million sale of Rio Ferdinand to Leeds United. Some were notably successful, such as the signings of Stuart Pearce, Trevor Sinclair, Paolo Di Canio, John Hartson, Eyal Berkovic and Ian Wright. Meanwhile, some were expensive, international players who failed at West Ham, such as Florin Raducioiu; Davor Šuker, who earned as much in wages as the revenue gained from one entire stand and yet made only eight appearances; Christian Bassila, who cost £720,000 and played only 86 minutes of football; Titi Camara; Gary Charles, whose wages amounted to £4.4 million but made only three starts for the club; Rigobert Song; Paulo Futre; and Marco Boogers, a player often quoted as one of the biggest failures in the Premier League. His first season in charge saw West Ham fighting the threat of relegation until the last few weeks, while his third season would also see another relegation battle. Always willing to enter the transfer market, Redknapp bought in the winter transfer window John Hartson and Paul Kitson who added the impetus needed at the season's end.

In 1999, West Ham finished fifth, their highest position in the top flight since 1986. They also won the Intertoto Cup beating French club Metz to qualify for the 1999–2000 UEFA Cup. Things began to falter for Redknapp with the sale for £18 million to Leeds of Rio Ferdinand in November 2000. Redknapp used the transfer money poorly with purchases such as Ragnvald Soma, who cost £800,000 and played only seven league games, Camara, and Song. Redknapp felt he needed more funds with which to deal in the transfer market. Chairman Brown lost patience with Redknapp due to his demands for further transfer funds. In June 2001, called to a meeting with Brown expecting to discuss contracts, he was fired. His assistant Frank Lampard left too, making the sale of his son Frank Lampard Jr., inevitable; in the summer of 2001, he joined Chelsea for £11 million.

With several names, such as former player Alan Curbishley, now linked with the job, Chairman Brown recruited from within the club, appointing reserve team coach Glenn Roeder as manager on 9 May 2001. He had already failed in management with Gillingham, where he lost 22 of the 35 games he managed, and Watford. His first big signings were the return of Don Hutchison for £5 million and Czech centre back Tomáš Řepka. Finishing seventh in his first season Roeder, in his office at Upton Park, suffered a blocked blood vessel in his brain. As Roeder needed medical help and recuperation, former stalwart Trevor Brooking stood in as caretaker manager. Despite not losing another game, the Hammers were relegated on the last day of the season at Birmingham City with a record for a relegated club of 42 points from a 38-game season. Ten seasons of top-tier football were over. Many top players including Joe Cole, Di Canio and Kanouté all left the club.

The next season, now in the second tier, Roeder resumed his stint as manager. Results were still poor, however, and after an away defeat to Rotherham United, he was sacked on 24 August 2003. Brooking again took over as caretaker. He lost only one game, a 2–0 away defeat to Gillingham and is known as "the best manager West Ham never had."

Former Crystal Palace player and manager of Reading Alan Pardew was lined up to be the next bench boss. Reading and their chairman, John Madejski, however, were reluctant to let him leave. After serving a period of notice and gardening leave, and with West Ham paying Reading £380,000 in compensation, he was appointed manager on 18 October 2003, their tenth manager. Pardew set out to rebuild the side bringing in Nigel Reo-Coker, Marlon Harewood and Brian Deane. In his first season in charge, they made the playoff final only to lose to Crystal Palace. His signings of Bobby Zamora, Matthew Etherington and veterans Chris Powell and Teddy Sheringham saw West Ham finishing sixth and subsequently beat Preston North End 1–0 thanks to a Zamora goal in the 2005 playoff final, securing a return to the Premier League. After ensuring promotion, Pardew said, "It's a team effort. We defended well and we're back where we belong."

Final years at the Boleyn (2005–2016)
On their return to the top division, West Ham finished in ninth place, The highlight of the 2005–06 season, however, was reaching the FA Cup final and taking favourites Liverpool to a penalty shootout after a 3–3 draw. West Ham lost the shootout, but nonetheless gained entry to the following season's UEFA Cup as Liverpool had already qualified for the Champions League. In August 2006, West Ham completed a major coup on the last day of the transfer window after completing the signings of Carlos Tevez and Javier Mascherano. The club was eventually bought by an Icelandic consortium, led by Eggert Magnússon, in November 2006. Manager Alan Pardew was sacked after poor form during the season and was replaced by former Charlton Athletic manager Alan Curbishley.

The signings of Mascherano and Tevez were investigated by the Premier League, who were concerned that details of the transfers had been omitted from official records. The club was found guilty and fined £5.5 million in April 2007. However, West Ham avoided a points deduction which ultimately became critical in their avoidance of relegation at the end of the 2006–07 season. Following on from this event, Wigan Athletic chairman Dave Whelan, supported by other sides facing possible relegation, including Fulham and Sheffield United, threatened legal action. West Ham escaped relegation by winning seven of their last nine games, including a 1–0 win over Arsenal, and on the last day of the season defeated newly crowned League Champions Manchester United 1–0 with a goal by Tevez to finish 15th.

In the 2007–08 season, West Ham remained reasonably consistently in the top half of the league table, with Freddie Ljungberg in the team, despite a slew of injuries; new signing Craig Bellamy missed most of the campaign, while Kieron Dyer was out from August 2007. The last game of the season, at the Boleyn Ground, saw West Ham draw 2–2 against Aston Villa, ensuring a tenth-place finish three points ahead of rivals Tottenham Hotspur. It was a five-place improvement on the previous season, and most importantly West Ham were never under any realistic threat of relegation.

After a row with the board over the sale of defenders Anton Ferdinand and George McCartney to Sunderland, manager Alan Curbishley resigned on 3 September 2008. His successor was former Chelsea striker Gianfranco Zola, who took over on 11 September 2008 to become the club's first non-British manager. In the 2008–09 season, West Ham finished ninth, a single place improvement.

In the 2009–10 season, West Ham started strongly with a 2–0 win over newly promoted Wolverhampton Wanderers with goals from Mark Noble and newly appointed captain Matthew Upson. A League Cup match against old rivals Millwall brought about violent riots outside the ground as well as pitch invasions and crowd trouble inside Upton Park.
In August 2009, the financial concerns of Icelandic owners parent companies left the current owners unable to provide any funds until a new owner was found. The club's shirt sponsor SBOBET provided the club with help to purchase a much needed striker, the Italian Alessandro Diamanti.

West Ham had a poor season which involved a prolonged battle against relegation. They finally secured their survival with two games remaining by defeating Wigan 3–2. The club managed to take 35 points from 38 games, seven fewer than the total they had when relegated seven years prior.
On 11 May 2010, two days after the end of the 2009–10 season, West Ham announced the termination of Zola's contract with immediate effect. On 3 June 2010, Avram Grant signed a four-year deal to become the next manager of West Ham subject to a work permit. West Ham's form continued to be poor with the team seldom outside the relegation zone, placing Grant's future as manager under serious doubt. A 4–0 Football League Cup quarter-final win over Manchester United was an otherwise bright spot in a disappointing season. West Ham's form in the Premier League did not affect their form in the two domestic cups. The Hammers reached the semi-final of the League Cup before being eliminated by eventual winners Birmingham City as well as the quarter final of the FA cup before a 2–1 defeat at Stoke City.

On 15 May 2011, West Ham's relegation to the Championship was confirmed after a comeback from Wigan at the DW Stadium. With West Ham leading 0–2 at half-time through two Demba Ba goals, Wigan battled back to win 3–2 thanks to an added-time strike from Charles N'Zogbia. Following the loss, West Ham announced the sacking of manager Avram Grant just one season into his tenure. On 1 June 2011, Sam Allardyce was appointed as manager as Grant's replacement.

The club finished third in the 2011–12 Football League Championship with 86 points and took part in the play-offs. They beat Cardiff City in the play-off semi-final 5–0 on aggregate to reach the final against Blackpool at Wembley on 19 May 2012. Carlton Cole opened the scoring, and although Blackpool equalised early in the second half, Ricardo Vaz Tê scored the winner for West Ham in the 87th minute.

West Ham, on their return to the Premier League, signed former players James Collins and George McCartney on permanent deals, as well as record signing Matt Jarvis and Andy Carroll on loan. They won their first game of the season, on 18 August 2012, 1–0 against Aston Villa thanks to a Kevin Nolan goal. The highlight of the first half of the season was a 3–1 home win against reigning European champions Chelsea on 1 December 2012 which saw them in eighth position and 12th at the end of the year. On 22 March 2013, West Ham secured a 99-year lease deal on the Olympic Stadium, with it planned to be used as their home ground from the 2016–17 season. Tenth place was secured at the end of the season with nine home wins and only three away from home. Only 11 away goals were scored, the lowest of the entire league.

In 2013–14, West Ham finished 13th in the Premier League. They also reached the semi-finals of the League Cup before losing 9–0 on aggregate to eventual cup-winners Manchester City. A feature of the season were the criticisms of manager Sam Allardyce by supporters relating to his perceived negative playing tactics. West Ham finished 12th in the 2014–15 Premier League, one place higher than the previous season. Minutes after the last game of the season, on 24 May 2015, the club announced that Allardyce's contract would not be renewed and that they were seeking a new manager. By winning the Premier League Fair Play table for 2014–15, West Ham qualified for the 2015–16 UEFA Europa League, entering at the first qualifying round.

On 9 June 2015, former West Ham player Slaven Bilić was appointed as manager on a three-year contract. In Bilić's fourth game in charge, the team won at Anfield for the first time in 52 years, beating Liverpool 0–3, with goals from Manuel Lanzini, Mark Noble and Diafra Sakho. At the end of the season, West Ham finished 7th in the Premier League. The team broke several records for the club in the Premier League era, including the highest number of points (62), the highest number of goals in a season (65), the fewest games lost in a season (8) and the lowest number of away defeats (5). The season also marked the last season where the team played at the Boleyn Ground, with them moving to the London Stadium from next season - ending their 112-year stay at the stadium.

Move to London Stadium and recent years (2016–)
Following Manchester United's win in the 2016 FA Cup Final, West Ham took their Europa League place and qualified for the third qualifying round of the 2016–17 edition. At the end of the tough first season at the London Stadium, the team finished 11th, along with having to deal with the departure of star man Dimitri Payet. However, the team suffered a poor start to the following season, taking only two wins in their opening 11 games. Following a 4–1 defeat to Liverpool at home and with the team threatened by relegation, Bilić was sacked on 6 November 2017. He was replaced by former Sunderland boss David Moyes on a contract till the end of the season. The team battled inconsistent form for the rest of the season but managed to avoid relegation and finish 13th. Moyes was not offered a new contract and left the club on the expiration of it on 16 May 2018.

On 22 May 2018, the club appointed former Manchester City boss Manuel Pellegrini as the new manager on a three-year deal contract. In his first season in charge, the Hammers finished 10th, once again suffering from inconsistent form. However, after a poor first half to the following season, Pellegrini was sacked in December 2019 with the team only one point above the relegation zone. His last game in charge was a 2–1 home loss to Leicester City. He was replaced by David Moyes, who returned for a second spell in charge a day later.

On 22 July 2020, the club secured their Premier League status for another season, following a 1–1 draw away to Manchester United. Ahead of the 2020–21 season, West Ham's ownership attracted criticism, including from club captain Mark Noble who publicly criticized the sale of academy graduate Grady Diangana. Despite losing the opening two games of the season, West Ham's form improved and by the end of November, the club sat in fifth place. The club would not drop out of a European spot for the rest of the season and went on to qualify for the 2021–22 UEFA Europa League group stages after finishing in 6th - exceeding many expectations. Moyes signed a new 3-year contract on 12 June 2021.

On 26 August 2021, West Ham were drawn in group H in the Europa League, alongside Dinamo Zagreb, Genk and Rapid Wien. 2021 culminated with West Ham sitting fifth in the Premier League, having reached the fifth round of the EFL Cup and winning group H of the Europa League. West Ham won their first three games of 2022, temporarily elevating the club to fourth place in the Premier League. On 10 March 2022, West Ham lost 1–0 away to Sevilla in the Europa League round of 16, before a 2–0 win after extra time seven days later secured West Ham's place in a European quarter-final for the first time in 41 years. On 14 April 2022, following a 1–1 draw a week prior at the London Stadium, West Ham defeated French club Lyon 3–0 at the Parc Olympique Lyonnais to set up West Ham's first European semi-final since 1976. Playing the same opposition they met in their 1976 European Cup Winners' Cup semi-final, Eintracht Frankfurt, the Hammers were knocked out of the Europa League, following a 3–1 aggregate loss to the German side. At the end of the 2021–22 Premier League season, West Ham confirmed a second successive season of European football, qualifying for the UEFA Europa Conference League after finishing seventh. The season was also notable for being Mark Noble's final as a West Ham player, with the midfielder retiring from football after 18 years as a first team player at the club, making 550 appearances in all competitions, scoring 62 times. By finishing 7th in the 2021–22 Premier League, West Ham qualified for the 2022–23 Europa Conference League entering at  the play-off stage.

Crest

Thames Ironworks FC
The Thames Ironworks Team (1895–1900) used the Union Flag as its badge.

Rivet Hammers
The principal element of the badge is the crossed pair of rivet hammers, tools that were used in the shipbuilding industry. The Blackwall and Canning Town neighbourhoods surrounding the Thames Ironworks echoed to the sound of hammers; steam hammers, sledge hammers and rivet hammers.

Seven large mechanical steam hammers would punch small holes near the edges of the iron plates which would be joined to build the ships. The plates would be put in place and fixed together with rivets by teams of five, three inside the emerging vessel and two outside.

Inside the ship one member of the team would heat the rivets till they were white hot and, using Iron Fingers (blacksmith's tongs), throw them to a second person known as a 'catch-boy' or 'putter-in' who would pick the rivet up and place it the hole, also using tongs. The third person was known as the 'holder-on' and he would then smash the rivet home with a sixteen-pound sledge hammer and then use his sledgehammer to hold the rivet in place while the men on the other side flattened the other end of the rivet.

Outside the ship, exposed to the elements, two men with rivet hammers – one right-handed, one left-handed – would hammer the protruding and still glowing rivet flat, so securing one of the many points necessary to link each of the ship's large plates.

The crossed hammers were also incorporated into the coat of arms of the County Borough of West Ham and those of its successor, the modern London Borough of Newham. The Thames Ironworks lay partly within what is now the London Borough of Tower Hamlets, however the blacksmiths tongs in that Borough's  coat of arms represent the local saint, Dunstan, the patron saint of Stepney and metalworkers, rather than the Ironworks.

Tower
A yellow or white tower was added, intermittently, from the 1950s onwards. The primary reason for this seems to be to represent Anne Boleyn’s Tower, the most notable feature of Green Street House, an originally Tudor group of buildings which stood next to the Boleyn Ground until demolished in 1955. Green Street House was also known as Boleyn Castle through an association with Anne Boleyn. The manor was reputedly one of the sites at which Henry VIII courted his second queen, though there is no documentary evidence to support the tradition.

There are a number of other factors which may have influenced the inclusion of the stylised castle feature, for instance:
 to reflect the contribution made to the club by players of Old Castle Swifts
 The imposing towers, roofs and doorway of the Engineering Department of the Thames Ironworks bore a strong resemblance to the castle feature in earlier iterations of the badge.
 The first verse of the club's anthem I'm forever blowing bubbles begins "I'm dreaming dreams, I'm scheming schemes, I'm building castles high".
 The White Tower of the Tower of London as emblematic of East London. For hundreds of years, up until 1900, inner East London had been known as the Tower Division, an area which owed military service to the Tower of London. The (originally whitewashed) White Tower was used as insignia for the area, for instance on cap badges of local units of the army.
 In recognition of the ‘West Ham Pals’, the 13th Battalion of the Essex Regiment which was raised in Stratford in 1915 and saw extensive action and heavy losses on the Western Front in the World War I. The Battalion was formed from volunteers from West Ham and East London generally. Their war cry was “Up the Hammers”. The cap badge of the Essex Regiment was the castle and key of Gibraltar, though the unit made an unsuccessful request to the War Office that crossed hammers could be used instead.
 The adoption (in 1904) of Boleyn Castle FC as the club's reserve side when they took over their grounds on the site.

Shield
A shield has been used in many iterations of the club badge, and the shape of the 2016 version matches the cross-section on the hull of HMS Warrior, the most famous ship built by the Thames Ironworks. However examining draughtsman's diagrams of the ship casts doubt on the resemblance between the shield and the ship.

Iterations
The crest was redesigned and updated in the late 1990s, featuring a wider yellow castle with fewer cruciform "windows" along with the peaked roofs being removed; the tops of the towers had previously made the castle appear more akin to Disneyland's Sleeping Beauty's Castle than a functioning fortress. The designer also altered other details to give a more substantial feel to the iconography.

When the club rebuilt the west stand of the Boleyn Ground (construction finished 2001–02) the "castle" from the redesigned badge was incorporated into the structure at the main entrance to the ground. A pair of towers were prominent features of the ground's appearance, both bearing large club badges.

A new badge was introduced following the end of the 2015–16 season, when the club moved into the Olympic Stadium. It removes the Boleyn Castle due to the club moving away, leaving just the crossed hammers, which the club says is inspired by the crest before and during the career of Bobby Moore. The word "London" was introduced below to "establish the club firmly on the international stage", and the more minimalist approach is to give a "strong statement that is instantly West Ham United".

Colours
The original colours of the team were dark blue, due to Thames Ironworks chairman Arnold Hills being a former student of Oxford University (see Oxford blue). However, the team used a variety of kits including the claret and sky blue house colours of Thames Ironworks, as well as sky blue or white kit.

The Irons permanently adopted claret and blue for home colours in 1903.

One story suggests that Thames Ironworks right-half Charlie Dove received the Aston Villa kit from William Belton, who was a professional sprinter of national repute, as well as being involved with the coaching at Thames Ironworks. Belton had been at a fair in Birmingham, close to Villa Park, the home ground of Aston Villa and was challenged to a race against four Villa players, who wagered money that one of them would win. Belton defeated them and, when they were unable to pay the bet, one of the Villa players who was responsible for washing the team's kit offered a complete team's "football kits" to Belton in payment. The Aston Villa player subsequently reported to his club that the kit was "missing." This, however, is often disputed.

Thames Ironworks, and later West Ham United, retained the claret yoke/blue sleeves design, but also continued to use their previously favoured colours for their away kits.

Supporters, hooliganism and rivalries

Supporters

The team's supporters are famous for their rendition of the chorus of their team's anthem, "I'm Forever Blowing Bubbles" introduced to the club by former manager Charlie Paynter in the late 1920s. A Pears soap commercial featuring the curly haired child in the Millais' "Bubbles" was well known at the time. The child resembled a player, Billy J. "Bubbles" Murray, from local schoolboy team, Park School, where the headmaster was Cornelius Beal. Beal was known locally for his music and rhyme and wrote special words to the tune of "I'm Forever Blowing Bubbles" whenever any player was having a good game.

Beal was a friend of Paynter, while Murray was a West Ham trialist and played football at schoolboy level with a number of West Ham players such as Jim Barrett. Through this contrivance of association the club's fans took it upon themselves to begin singing the popular music hall tune before home games, sometimes reinforced by the presence of a house band requested to play the refrain by Charlie Paynter.

The 1975 FA Cup version – which contains the original lyrics, and features vocals from the team's then-current players – is always played before home games, with the home crowd joining in and carrying the song on after the music stops at the verse line "Fortune's always hiding". Bubbles was published as a waltz whereas during the game the crowd sing it in common time.

Since the 1950s, fans have also sung the East London pub song Knees Up Mother Brown. The song title is also the name of an internet forum related to the club.

Like other teams, the team also have a history of adopting or adapting popular songs of the day to fit particular events, themes, players or personas. These have included serious renditions of theatre and movie classics such as "The Bells are Ringing," along with more pun-laden or humorous efforts, such as chanting former player Paolo Di Canio's name to the canzone "La donna è mobile" by Giuseppe Verdi, or D.I. Canio to the tune of Ottawan's "D.I.S.C.O.", or the chant of "Who Let The Potts Out?" to the tune of Baha Men's "Who Let the Dogs Out?" when Steve Potts could be seen warming up to come on as substitute late on in his career, or "That's Zamora" to the tune of Dean Martin's 1953 "That's Amore" in honour of former striker Bobby Zamora. Other former players to be serenaded include Christian Dailly with vastly-altered lyrics to Frankie Valli's "Can't Take My Eyes Off You", Joe Cole and Carlton Cole with Spandau Ballet's "Gold" song title sung as "Cole" and Luděk Mikloško. A song for West Ham favourite Bobby Moore, "Viva Bobby Moore", is also sung based on The Business's "Oi!" rendition of the song, based on The Equals' 1969 release "Viva Bobby Joe". In 2016, supporters adapted the lyrics of Billy Ray Cyrus' "Achy Breaky Heart" in honour of Dimitri Payet.

When the players come onto the pitch, and at other times of celebration, as the song I'm forever blowing bubbles is being sung, around 60 bubble machines produce copious bubbles that rise high into the stadium.
Fans gained national attention after giving a torrid time to David Beckham in his first away match of 1998–99 the season after the England midfielder was sent off for a petulant foul on Diego Simeone. Coinciding with the game, there were claims (and an image taken) that fans, organised by a hardcore, had hung an effigy of the player outside a local pub. Although it was later revealed that the pub was in South-East London, the heartland of West Ham's greatest rivals Millwall. The West Ham fans did, however, boo Beckham's every touch of the ball during the game.

They have also displayed a particular zeal when it comes to abusing former players, particularly those who are perceived to have abandoned the club or performed some disservice. Paul Ince, Frank Lampard, Jermain Defoe, Nigel Reo-Coker   and Jesse Lingard have famously borne the brunt of verbal assaults and a guaranteed hostile reception at Upton Park. However, players such as Joe Cole, Michael Carrick, Rio Ferdinand, Bobby Zamora and Carlos Tevez receive applause and even standing ovations in honour of their contributions during their time at the club. Joe Cole subsequently rejoined West Ham from Liverpool midway through the 2012–13 season.

Hooliganism
The origins of West Ham's links with organised football-related violence starts in the 1960s with the establishment of The Mile End Mob (named after an area of the East End of London). During the 1970s and 1980s (the main era for organised football-related violence), West Ham gained further notoriety for the levels of hooliganism in their fan base and antagonistic behaviour towards both their own and rival fans, and the police. During the 1970s in particular, rival groups of West Ham fans from neighbouring areas often did battle with each other at games, most often groups from the neighbouring districts of Barking and Dagenham.

The Inter City Firm were one of the first "casuals", so called because they avoided police supervision by not wearing football-related clothing and travelled to away matches on regular InterCity trains, rather than on the cheap and more tightly policed "football special" charter trains. The group were an infamous West Ham-aligned gang. As the firm's moniker "inter city" suggests violent activities were not confined to local derbies – the hooligans were content to cause trouble at any game, though nearby teams often bore the brunt.

Both the 1989 film The Firm (starring Gary Oldman), and the 2005 film Green Street (starring Elijah Wood and Charlie Hunnam) are based upon West Ham hooligan firms.

Rivalries

West Ham have strong rivalries with several other clubs. Most of these are with other London clubs, especially with Tottenham Hotspur in an East versus North London derby and with Chelsea in an East versus West London rivalry. The rivalry between West Ham and Tottenham has been fuelled by players such as Michael Carrick, Martin Peters, Paul Allen, Jermain Defoe and Scott Parker leaving the Hammers to join Tottenham. The rivalry deepened with the appointment of former Hammers manager Harry Redknapp as Tottenham's manager. Since the 2006–07 Premier League season, West Ham have developed a strong rivalry with Yorkshire club Sheffield United due to the dubious circumstances surrounding the transfer of Carlos Tevez, who helped West Ham avoid relegation at Sheffield United's expense.

The oldest and fiercest rivalry is with Millwall. The two sides are local rivals, having both been founded by employees of local companies, with players living in the same localities. The early history of both clubs are intertwined, with West Ham proving to be the more successful in a number of meetings between the two teams at the time, resulting in West Ham being promoted at the expense of Millwall. Millwall later declined to join the fledgling Football League while West Ham went on to the top division and an FA Cup final. Later in the 1920s, the rivalry was intensified during strike action which Isle of Dogs-based companies (i.e., Millwall fans) refused to support, breeding ill will between the two camps, the bitterness of this betrayal enduring for years. In 1972, a Millwall supporter died at New Cross station after falling out of a train during a fight with West Ham fans.

The rivalry between West Ham and Millwall has involved considerable violence and is one of the most notorious within the world of football hooliganism. The teams were drawn against each other in the second round of the 2009–10 League Cup and met on 25 August 2009 at Upton Park. This was the first time in four years that the two clubs had played each other, and the first ever in the League Cup. Clashes between fans occurred outside the ground, resulting in violence erupting up to half a mile away from the stadium, with serious injuries, including the stabbing of a Millwall supporter, damage to property and several arrests reported by police. There were also several pitch invasions by West Ham supporters which brought a temporary halt to the game. In January 2010, West Ham were fined after being found guilty of violent, threatening, obscene and provocative behaviour and of failing to prevent their fans entering the field of play. Millwall were cleared of all charges.

Nicknames
The team and supporters are known as The Hammers, in part because of the club's origins as Thames Ironworks. They are also known as The Irons.

Stadium

Until 2016, West Ham were based at the Boleyn Ground, commonly known as Upton Park, in Newham, East London. The capacity of the Boleyn Ground was 35,016, and had been West Ham's ground since 1904. Prior to this, in their previous incarnation of Thames Ironworks, they played at Hermit Road in Canning Town and briefly at Browning Road in East Ham, before moving to the Memorial Grounds in Plaistow in 1897. They retained the stadium during their transition to becoming West Ham United and were there for a further four seasons before moving to the Boleyn Ground in 1904.

Former chairman Eggert Magnússon made clear his ambition for West Ham to move to the Olympic Stadium after the 2012 Summer Olympics, a desire reiterated by current chairmen Gold and Sullivan when they assumed control of the club stating that they felt it was a logical move for the Government as it was in the borough of Newham.

In February 2010, however, the British Olympic Minister stated that West Ham would not get the stadium, and it would instead be used for track and field. On 17 May 2010, West Ham and Newham London Borough Council submitted a formal plan to the Olympic Park Legacy Company for the use of the Olympic Stadium following the 2012 Summer Olympics. The proposal was for a stadium with a capacity of 60,000 which would retain a competition athletics track. The proposal was welcomed by the chairman of UK athletics, Ed Warner, who said, "I think it will feel great as a football stadium and I speak as a football fan as well the chairman of UK Athletics. I think you'd find West Ham would cover the track in the winter season so it wouldn't look like you had a track between you and the pitch."

On 30 September 2010, the club formally submitted its bid for the Olympic Stadium with a presentation at 10 Downing Street, and on 8 October 2010 the world's largest live entertainment company, Live Nation, endorsed the club's Olympic Stadium plans. Three days after Live Nation's endorsement, UK Athletics confirmed its formal support for West Ham United and Newham Council in their joint bid to take over the Olympic Stadium in legacy mode. In November 2010, West Ham began a search for potential developers for "informal discussions" about what would happen to the ground if it were to win its bid to take over the Olympic Stadium after the 2012 Games. According to the club, the site could be vacated and open to redevelopment by summer 2014. On 11 February 2011, the Olympic Park Legacy Committee selected West Ham as the preferred club to move into the Olympic Stadium after the 2012 Games.

The decision in favour of West Ham's bid was unanimous, although controversial as local Premier League rivals Tottenham Hotspur had also been bidding for the venue. Hopes of moving to the stadium, however, were since placed under doubt following a legal challenge by Tottenham and Leyton Orient, with Leyton Orienta perennial (since 1980) tier 3 to tier 5 clubfearful that having West Ham playing less than a mile away from their Brisbane Road ground could steal support from the club and put them out of business. Both clubs' appeal for a judicial review, however, were rejected on 23 June 2011. On 3 March 2011, West Ham's proposed move to the Olympic Stadium was formally approved by the British government and Mayor of London Boris Johnson.

On 8 June 2011, it was confirmed that the Westfield Shopping Centre had been in detailed talks with West Ham for naming rights of the new Olympic stadium which could be called the Westfield Stadium. West Ham announced plans to move from the Boleyn Ground from the 2014–15 season. In August 2011, an independent investigation initiated by the Olympic Park Legacy Company upheld the decision to award West Ham the Olympic Stadium after the 2012 Games. On 29 June 2011, however, Tottenham announced that they were returning to the High Court again to fight the decision to award West Ham the stadium, in an oral hearing, to try to overturn the original High Court appeal being rejected. On 25 August 2011, Tottenham and Leyton Orient were in fact granted a judicial review by the High Court into the Olympic Stadium bidding process. On 11 October 2011, the deal to award West Ham the Olympic Stadium collapsed over concerns of legal pressure, with the government deciding that the stadium will stay in public ownership. Six days later, Tottenham and Leyton Orient announced they had ended their legal challenge after the deal collapsed.

Once the original deal collapsed, a new process to select a tenant was begun. West Ham immediately announced plans to become tenants of the stadium. By March 2012, West Ham was one of the four bidders for the Stadium. With a decision due by the Olympic Park Legacy Company in May 2012, Mayor of London Boris Johnson delayed the final selection of future tenants until completion of the 2012 Summer Olympics, stating that it was "overwhelmingly likely" that the tenants would be West Ham.

It was announced on 22 March 2013 that West Ham had signed a 99-year lease for the Olympic Stadium after the government agreed to put in an extra £1 million towards the costs of converting the site. The club's plan was to move into the stadium prior to the start of the 2016–17 season. Supporters of rival clubs had pressed for an inquiry into the granting of West Ham's tenancy, arguing that West Ham were being given an unfair advantage by the arrangement. In September 2015, however, the government rejected holding such an inquiry.

The Academy of Football

The club promotes the popular idea of West Ham being "The Academy of Football", with the moniker adorning the ground's new stadium façade. The comment predominantly refers to the club's youth development system which was established by manager Ted Fenton during the 1950s, that has seen a number of international players emerge through the ranks. Most notably, the club contributed three players to the World Cup-winning England side of 1966, including club icon Bobby Moore, as well as Martin Peters and Geoff Hurst who between them scored all of England's goals in the eventual 4–2 victory. Other academy players that have gone on to play for England have included Trevor Brooking, Alvin Martin, Tony Cottee, Paul Ince, and Declan Rice.

Since the late 1990s, Rio Ferdinand, Frank Lampard, Joe Cole, Michael Carrick and Glen Johnson began their careers at West Ham and all went on to play for much bigger clubs. Frustratingly for fans and managers alike, the club has struggled to retain many of these players due to (predominantly) financial reasons. West Ham, during the 2007–08 season, had an average of 6.61 English players in the starting line up, higher than any other Premier League club, which cemented their status as one of the few Premier League clubs left that were recognised to be bringing through young English talent and were recognised as having "homegrown players." Between 2000 and 2011, the club produced eight England players, as many as Manchester United and one fewer than Arsenal. Much of the success of the Academy has been attributed to Tony Carr, who was West Ham youth coach between 1973 and 2014.

Players

First-team squad

Other players under contract

Out on loan

Under-21s

Former players

Retired numbers

 6   Bobby Moore, Defender (1958–74) – posthumous honour
 38  Dylan Tombides, Striker (2010–14) – posthumous honour

Club captains

West Ham dream team

In the 2003 book The Official West Ham United Dream Team, 500 fans were quizzed for who would be in their all time Hammers Eleven. The voting was restricted to players from the modern era.

Hammer of the Year

The following is a list of recipients of the 'Hammer of the Year' award. The first award, to Andy Malcolm in 1957–58, was nominated by a journalist at The Stratford Express. Subsequent recipients would be awarded the title after a vote by supporters. Trevor Brooking was the first player for West Ham United to have been honoured with the title of Hammer of the Year three times in a row in 1976, 1977 and 1978. Scott Parker repeated this feat between 2009 and 2011. Brooking has won the award the most times, on five occasions: 1972, 1976, 1977, 1978 and 1984. Bobby Moore, Billy Bonds and Julian Dicks have each won it four times.

Bobby Moore has been runner-up four times, while Billy Bonds and Tony Cottee have both been runners-up three times.

Billy Bonds and Trevor Brooking's wins are notable in the amount of time between first and last Hammer of the Year award. Bonds has 16 years separating his wins whilst Brooking has 12.

Lifetime Achievement Award
In 2013, West Ham United introduced a new annual award, the West Ham United Lifetime Achievement Award.

The first award was presented to club-record appearance maker Billy Bonds, who picked up the award on the pitch at Upton Park before kick-off against Cardiff City on the opening day of the 2013–14 season.

The 2014 award was presented to Sir Trevor Brooking, a record five-time winner of the Hammer of the Year award. Brooking received the award before the 2014–15 season curtain-raiser against Tottenham Hotspur on 16 August 2014. Brooking had already had the Centenary Stand at the Boleyn ground named after him in 2009.

The 2015 award was awarded to Martin Peters.

On 3 May 2016, it was announced via the club's official website that the fourth recipient of the award would be Sir Geoff Hurst, the club's second all-time leading goalscorer, and scorer of a hat-trick in the 1966 World Cup Final. Hurst would be honoured at the club's 2015/16 Player Awards Ceremony. Ken Brown became the sixth recipient of the award, in April 2018. The 2019 honour was awarded to midfielder Ronnie Boyce who made his debut for West Ham in 1960.

Mark Noble Young Hammer of the Year Award
In honour of Mark Noble, who was also the award winner in 2004, and had been serving the club since 2000 and retired in 2022, the Young Hammer of the Year award was renamed to Mark Noble Young Hammer of the Year Award on 9 May 2022.

Current staff

Staff and directors

Coaching staff

Managers
West Ham United have had 17 permanent managers in their history and an additional three caretaker managers.

Ownership and chairmen

In January 2010, David Sullivan and David Gold acquired a 50% share in West Ham, given them overall operational and commercial control. At the end of May 2010, Gold and Sullivan purchased a further 10% stake in the club at a cost of £8 million. Taking their controlling stake to 60%, they announced that they could open up shares for fans to purchase. On 9 August 2010, Gold and Sullivan increased their shares up to 30.6% each with "minority investors", (which included former owner Terry Brown, purchasing a further 3.8% of the club at a cost of around −4 million) leaving Icelandic Straumur Investment Bank owning 35% of the club.

On 2 July 2013, Sullivan acquired a further 25% of shares after restructuring the debt of the club, leaving Straumur Bank with just 10%. In order to clear club debts before a move to the Olympic Stadium in 2016, in December 2014 Sullivan announced the availability for sale of 20% of the club. The clearing of club debts, given in July 2013 as £70 million, was given as a pre-condition to a move to the Olympic Stadium.

On 10 November 2021, the club announced Czech billionaire Daniel Křetínský had acquired 27% of the shares of the club, reducing Gold and Sullivan's shares at the club.

Co-chairman David Gold passed away on 4 January 2023, leaving Sullivan as the sole chairman.

European and international record

Honours

Domestic

Leagues
 First Division/Premier League (Tier 1)
 Highest placing: 3rd, 1985–86
 Second Division/Championship (Tier 2)
 Champions (2): 1957–58, 1980–81
 Runners-up: 1922–23, 1990–91, 1992–93
 Play-off winners: 2005, 2012
 Southern League First Division:
 Highest placing: 3rd, 1912–13
 Western Football League:
 Champions: 1906–07
 Section A champions: 1906–07

Cups
 FA Cup
 Winners (3): 1963–64, 1974–75, 1979–80
 Runners-up: 1922–23, 2005–06
 League Cup
 Runners-up: 1965–66, 1980–81
 FA Charity Shield:
 Winners: 1964 (shared)
 Runners-up: 1975, 1980
 Football League War Cup:
 Winners: 1940
 Southern Floodlit Cup:
 Winners: 1956
 Runners-up: 1960
 London Challenge Cup
 Winners (9): 1924–25, 1925–26, 1929–30, 1946–47, 1948–49, 1952–53, 1956–57, 1967–68, 1968–69
 Essex Professional Cup:
 Winners (3): 1951, 1955 (shared), 1959
 Runners-up: 1952, 1958
 London Charity Cup
 Runners-up: 1902

Wartime
 London Combination:
 Champions: 1916–17
 Runners-up: 1915–16 (Supplementary Tournament), 1917–18
 League South A:
 Runners-up: 1939–40
 League South C:
 Runners-up: 1939–40
 Regional League South:
 Runners-up: 1940–41
 League South:
 Runners-up: 1943–44, 1944–45

As Thames Ironworks F.C.
 Southern League Division Two
Winners: 1898–99
 London champions: 1898–99
 London League
Winners: 1897–98
 Runners-up: 1896–97
 West Ham Charity Cup
Winners: 1896
 Runners-up: 1897

European
 European Cup Winners' Cup
 Winners: 1964–65
 Runners-up: 1975–76
 UEFA Intertoto Cup
 Winners: 1999
 Anglo-Italian League Cup
 Runners-up: 1975

International
 International Soccer League
 Winners: 1963
 American Challenge Cup
 Runners-up: 1963

Indoor 
 London Fives
Winners: 	1967, 1970, 1984
Runners-up: 1955, 1957, 1960, 1971, 1974, 1977, 1981

Other
 BBC Sports Personality of the Year Team Award: 1965
 Honorary Degree (awarded to the club) in 2009 by the University of East London

Statistics and records

Attendance
 Record attendance: 62,467 vs Brentford, Premier League, 30 December 2022
At the Boleyn Ground: 42,322 v Tottenham Hotspur, Division One, 17 October 1970
Lowest league attendance: 4,373 v Doncaster Rovers, Division Two, 24 February 1955

Transfers
 Biggest transfer fee paid: £51.2 million to Lyon for Lucas Paquetá, 29 August 2022
 Biggest transfer fee received: £25 million from Marseille for Dimitri Payet, 29 January 2017

Record results and performances

Victories
 League:
 Premier League:
 Home: 6–0 v Barnsley, 10 January 1998
 Away: 5–0 v Derby County, 10 November 2007
 Division One:
 Home: 8–0 v Sunderland, 19 October 1968
 Away: 6–1 v Manchester City, 8 September 1962
 Division Two:
 Home: 8–0 v Rotherham United, 8 March 1958
 Away: 6–0 v Leicester City, 15 February 1923
 FA Cup:
 Home: 8–1 v Chesterfield (round one), 10 January 1914
 Away: 5–0 v Chatham Town (5th qualifying round), 28 November 1903
 League Cup:
 Home: 10–0 v Bury (round two second leg) (12–1 aggregate scoreline), 25 October 1983
 Away: 5–1 v Cardiff City (semi-final second leg) (10–3 aggregate scoreline), 2 February 1966
 Away: 5–1 v Walsall (round two), 13 September 1967
 European Cup Winners' Cup:
 Home: 5–1 v Castilla CF (round one second leg) (6–4 aggregate scoreline), 1 October 1980
 Away: 2–1 v Lausanne (quarter final second leg), (6–4 aggregate scoreline) 16 March 1965
 UEFA Cup/Europa League:
 Home: 3–0 v Osijek (round one first leg), 16 September 1999
 Home: 3–0 v Lusitanos (first qualifying round first leg), 2 July 2015
 Home: 3–0 v Genk (group H), 21 October 2021
 Away: 3–0 v Lyon (quarter final second leg), (4–1 aggregate score line) 14 April 2022

Defeats
 League:
 Premier League:
 Away: 0–6 v Everton, 8 May 1999
 Division One:
 Home: 2–8 v Blackburn Rovers, 26 December 1963
 Away: 0–7 v Sheffield Wednesday, 28 November 1959
 Division Two:
 Away: 0–7 v Barnsley, 1 September 1919
 FA Cup:
 Away: 0–6 v Manchester United (round four), 26 January 2003
 League Cup:
 Away: 0–6 v Oldham Athletic (semi-final first leg), 14 February 1990
 Away: 0–6 v Manchester City (semi-final first leg), 8 January 2014
 European Cup Winners' Cup:
 Home: 1–4 v Dinamo Tbilisi (quarter final first leg) (2–4 aggregate scoreline), 4 March 1981
 Away: 2–4 v FC Den Haag (quarter final first leg) (5–5 aggregate scoreline, West Ham won on away goals), 3 March 1976
 Neutral: 2–4 v Anderlecht (Final), 5 May 1976
 UEFA Cup:
 Home: 0–1 v Palermo (round one first leg), 14 September 2006
 Away: 0–3 v Palermo (round one second leg), 28 September 2006

Club league highs and lows

Club goal records
 Most league goals in a season:
 101, Division Two (1957–58)
 Top league scorer in a season:
 Vic Watson (42) Div. One (1929–30)
 Top scorer in a season:
 Vic Watson (50) Div. One (1929–30)
 Most goals in one match:
 Vic Watson (6) v Leeds United (h) 9 February 1929
 Geoff Hurst (6) v Sunderland (h) 19 October 1968
Follow link to Official West Ham United Records Page

Player records

In popular culture
 In a Monty Python sketch four communist thinkers and leaders appear on a news show World Forum, where they are asked football questions.  Karl Marx fails to identify the nickname "the Hammers" as the nickname for West Ham.
 Steve Harris, leader of heavy metal band Iron Maiden, is a West Ham fan and was once scouted by the club. He has long displayed its logo on his Fender Precision bass guitar. The band and club have also collaborated on some merchandise, such as special edition shirts.
 For the IT Crowd episode "Are We Not Men" Roy pretends to enjoy football and claims to be a follower of West Ham, thinking he made the team up.  Instead, it turns out everyone at the table is a supporter and they invite him to a match.
 In the final episode of season two of Ted Lasso, "Inverting the Pyramid of Success", former Richmond owner Rupert Mannion buys West Ham and installs Richmond's former kitman-turned-coach, Nate Shelley, as the head coach.
 In the British sitcom Till Death Us Do Part and its follow-on and spin-off series Till Death... and In Sickness and in Health the character Alf Garnett's  biggest passion in life was his local football team West Ham United.
 The action film Final Score, a 2018 release starring Dave Bautista and Pierce Brosnan, was filmed at the club's former Upton Park stadium shortly before its demolition. It concerns a takeover of the venue during a fictional European cup game between West Ham and a Russian team. Co-owner David Sullivan is credited as executive producer.

See also

References

Bibliography

External links

 
 
 West Ham United News – Sky Sports
 Knees up Mother Brown (KUMB.com) – the supporters' website

 
Association football clubs established in 1895
Football clubs in England
Premier League clubs
Former English Football League clubs
FA Cup winners
Football clubs in London
Southern Football League clubs
1895 establishments in England
UEFA Cup Winners' Cup winning clubs
UEFA Intertoto Cup winning clubs